A sitar is a South-Asian musical instrument.

Sitar may also refer to:

Places
 Sitar, Iran (disambiguation), ( in Iran)
 Sitar, Iran, in Sand-e Mir Suiyan Rural District, Dashtiari District, Chabahar County, Sistan and Baluchestan Province; a village
 Sitar-e Abdol Rahim, also called "Sītār", in Sand-e Mir Suiyan Rural District, Dashtiari District, Chabahar County, Sistan and Baluchestan Province, Iran; a village

People with the name
 Jeff Sitar, a world champion safecracker
 Lord Sitar, the stage name of the musician Big Jim Sullivan (1941-2012) and the title of his 1968 sitar music album

Brands and enterprises
 SITAR, a French aircraft company which manufactured the SITAR GY-110 Sher Khan
 Swedish Indian IT Resources AB (or SITAR), a division of Tata Consultancy Services

See also
 Satar (disambiguation)
 Setar (disambiguation)